The Majura Training Area (MTA) is a facility belonging to the Australian Department of Defence located to the east of Mount Majura in the Majura district in the Australian Capital Territory, Australia. The MTA is used primarily by the Australian Army for the conduct of field exercises and weapon qualification shoots.  The MTA is located near to the Royal Military College, Duntroon and the Australian Defence Force Academy and is frequently used by these training establishments. Accommodation and support on the range is through 'Camp Blake', which consists of headquarters buildings, Q-Store, Mess, Staff accommodation and amenities and trainee accommodation and amenities.

The MTA contains a number of shooting ranges including the 600m Marksmanship Training Range (MTR), 25m Pistol range, Grenade range and multiple other ranges. Artillery ranges are also situated on the site and are designated as danger areas due to the risk of unexploded ordnance.

Military installations in the Australian Capital Territory